Coixcas describes a pre-conquest community, and its inhabitants, located between the modern Mexican towns of Tixtla and Apango.  The Coixcas people resisted and repulsed attempts by the Aztecs to conquer their community.  The area was later captured by the Spanish conquistadores.

Ruins 
According to the people of modern Apango, there are few ruins of the ancient settlement, except a small temple three kilometers (2 miles) from the present Atliaca, midway between Apango and Tixtla.

Mestizaje 
As part of the Casta process of the Spanish conquest, the people of Coixcas were merged into the community in Apango.

References

History of Mexico